Pietro Antonio Avanizi (died 1733) was an Italian painter of the Baroque period, active in Piacenza. He was born in Parma, and trained with Marcantonio Franceschini.

References

1733 deaths
18th-century Italian painters
Italian male painters
Italian Baroque painters
Year of birth unknown
18th-century Italian male artists